Francesco Di Mariano (born 20 April 1996) is an Italian professional footballer who plays as a winger for  club Palermo.

Career
Di Mariano started playing football in Palermo, then at the age of 13 he left for Lecce. He made his professional debut with Lecce on 9 September 2012 against Cuneo in the Lega Pro Prima Divisione.

Following spells at Ancona and Monopoli on loan from Roma, Di Mariano joined Novara on 20 July 2016.

On 29 January 2020, he joined Juve Stabia on loan with an obligation to buy. He successively returned to Lecce, being part of the squad that won promotion to Serie A by the end of the 2021–22 Serie B campaign.

On 16 August 2022, Lecce announced Di Mariano had been transferred to his hometown club Palermo, signing a three-year contract for the Rosanero.

Personal life
He is the nephew of Italian former footballer Salvatore Schillaci.

References

External links
 
 

1996 births
Footballers from Palermo
Living people
Italian footballers
Association football forwards
U.S. Lecce players
A.S. Roma players
A.C. Ancona players
Novara F.C. players
Venezia F.C. players
S.S. Juve Stabia players
Palermo F.C. players
Serie A players
Serie B players
Serie C players